Dipsas gaigeae, Gaige's thirst snail-eater,  is a non-venomous snake found in Mexico.

References

Dipsas
Snakes of North America
Endemic fauna of Mexico
Reptiles of Mexico
Reptiles described in 1937